Clive Philip Stoneham, OBE (12 April 1909 – 3 July 1992) was an Australian politician. He was an ALP member of the Victorian Legislative Assembly for over 27 years from November 1942 to April 1970, representing the electorates of Maryborough and Daylesford (1942–1945) and Midlands (1945–1970). From 1958 to 1967 he was Opposition Leader; he lost the elections of 1961, 1964 and 1967 to the incumbent Liberal Premier Sir Henry Bolte.

Family
Stoneham married Maisie Chesterfield in 1930.

His mother was the pioneer New Zealand unionist Ada Florence Whitehorn, and his father John Stoneham, a piano tuner.

References

 

|-

1909 births
1992 deaths
Members of the Victorian Legislative Assembly
Australian Officers of the Order of the British Empire
Leaders of the Opposition in Victoria (Australia)
Australian Labor Party members of the Parliament of Victoria
Australian people of New Zealand descent
20th-century Australian politicians
Victorian Ministers for Agriculture